is a judicial decision of the Privy Council in relation to contract law, company law and constitutional law. It concerns the correct method for interpretation and implication of terms into a company's articles of association.

It was approved by the UK Supreme Court in Société Générale, London Branch v Geys and Marks and Spencer plc v BNP Paribas Securities Services Trust Company (Jersey) Ltd.

Facts
In 1989 Belize privatised its telecommunications network. Established the year after independence in 1974, the Belize Telecommunications Authority's business and assets were transferred to a corporation called Belize Telecommunications Ltd (renamed Belize Telemedia in 2007). The government was to gradually sell off its shares, but in the process retain a "special share" (often called a golden share). According to the company's constitution, among various rights over important transactions, the special shareholder could appoint two of the eight directors. Class "B" shareholders (which were all private investors, such as British Telecom) could appoint two directors and class "C" shareholders could together appoint four directors. The government owned class "C" shares, and there was a further provision that if the special shareholder still had over 37.5% of the total share capital, it would be entitled to appoint two of those four "C" directors.

In 2003 the government decided to complete the privatisation process. Legislation was passed to try to let competition into the telecoms market. In 2004 Belize Telecom bought the special share from the government. It also bought the "C" shares the government still owned. But to finance this, it took out a loan from the government. In other words, the government converted its shares in Belize Telecommunications Ltd to debt. For security until the debt was repaid, the government obtained a pledge on the shares it had just sold (but not the special share). Immediately Belize Telecom appointed new directors, replacing the government appointees. But unfortunately on 9 February 2005, Belize Telecom defaulted on its loan repayments. The government enforced its pledge, and now once again had over 37.5% of the "C" shares, but without the special share. The question was whether the two directors that were subject to appointment by the person who held the special share and over 37.5% of the "C" shares could be removed. As it stood, nobody held both the special share and 37.5% of the "C" shares. The company's constitution did not have any provisions about this situation.

In 2008, after the United Democratic Party was elected on a platform of anti-corruption and honesty, this action was brought to change the board. Belize Telecom argued that those two directors were not removable. The Attorney General, for the government, argued this would be absurd and the articles should be construed as providing that a director should leave office if the specified shareholding which brought him there ceased to exist. Conteh CJ in the Belize Supreme Court agreed with the government and said that a term allowing the government with its 37.5% stake should be allowed to remove those two directors and appoint new ones. But Carey JA in the Court of Appeal held that there was no "necessity" in reading in such words. Morrison JA emphasised that art 90(D)(ii) provided for appointment and removal of directors, but nothing for tenure of office, and that therefore Conteh CJ's interpretation could not be "derived from the language of the articles". The Attorney General appealed.

Advice

Giving the advice of the Privy Council, Lord Hoffmann set out the principles for interpretation of a company's articles such as this. He stated that the same principles of interpretation apply whether it is a company's constitution, a contract or an Act of Parliament. A court should search for the meaning of any such document with all relevant contextual facts in mind, and consider the meaning it would convey to a reasonable person. He emphasised it was not relevant, in cases where a gap was left, what the parties hypothetically "would have" concluded, a hypothetical inquiry which he referred to as "barren". The important point was to ask what interpretation, and implication would be consistent with the scheme of the company constitution (or contract or Act of Parliament). For this reason, Lord Hoffmann agreed with Conteh CJ that the directors could be removed. The scheme of the privatisation programme was to balance the interests of the government and private investors according to their economic interest. As such, it would have been absurd that just because the special share and the possession of 37.5% of ordinary shares had become disjointed that the incumbent directors would be irremovable. So given the gap in the articles, it was consistent with the scheme of the company's articles that the two directors in question would be appointable by the government. Lord Hoffmann's advice on the law read as follows.

Significance

The case of AG of Belize v Belize Telecom Ltd has been widely cited as the new and all encompassing statement on implied terms. In Mediterranean Salvage & Towage Ltd v Seamar Trading & Commerce Inc, Lord Clarke MR said the following:

See also

English contract law
Imperial Hydropathic Hotel Co, Blackpool v Hampson (1883) 23 Ch D 1
Chartbrook Ltd v Persimmon Homes Ltd [2009] UKHL 38
The Achilleas
Liverpool CC v Irwin
Pepper v Hart
Rayfield v Hands [1960] Ch 1

United States
United States v. American Trucking Associations 310 US 534, 543 (1940) when the plain meaning of a statute is inconsistent with legislative history, then a literal reading need not be taken
INS v. Cardoza-Fonseca 480 US 421, 432 (1987)
AL Corbin, Corbin on Contracts (2nd edn 1964) and Restatement (Second) of Contracts (1979), where the idea of implied terms being part of the broader process of construction originates

Notes

References
HLA Hart, 'Positivism and The Separation of Law and Morals' (1958) 71 Harvard Law Review 593
L Fuller, 'Positivism and Fidelity to Law - A Reply to Professor Hart' (1958) 71 Harvard Law Review 630, arguing that a purposive interpretation to legislation was consistent with Hart's positivist thesis.
Holmes v Lord Keyes [1959] Ch 199

External links
Belize Telemedia

United Kingdom company case law
English implied terms case law
English interpretation case law
Judicial Committee of the Privy Council cases on appeal from Belize
2009 in case law
2009 in Belize